Strawberry Fair is a local festival of music, entertainments, arts and crafts which has been held in Cambridge, England, since 1974. The fair is held on Midsummer Common on the first Saturday in June. It is completely run and organised by volunteers from all different backgrounds. It is believed to be one of the UKs biggest free volunteer run festivals which is still open to the public.

It has been held since 1974 except for 2010, when it was cancelled due to licensing issues, and 2020 and 2021 when it went virtual due to the global COVID-19 pandemic. From 2011 to 2019 and returning in 2022, where rough festival attended numbers reached 30,000 people. Some stages, such as Green Machine, were absent in 2022 due to crowding and crowd management issues.

First Aid provision is usually provided by St John's Ambulance and there is an on-site welfare tent.

The fair has a perimeter fence erected around the festival for crowd control purposes as well as checkpoints at the gates for excessive alcohol, drugs and weapons. As of 2022 the current rule for alcohol is no spirits and only four cans of alcohol per person.

Events

The 2011 parade was part of the UK Centre for Carnival Arts 'Carnival Crossroads' project and featured colourful costumes and samba bands. There was a Village Green area with traditional community activities such as re-enactment displays, It's A Knockout, fancy dress pageant and a grand finale. Other attractions were the Wigwam Stage, The Green Area, Kids Area, the acoustic and cabaret bar, and Colonel Maybey's Mechanical Menagerie a new 'steam diesel punk' area, in addition to around 300 stalls selling food and goods. Entry to the fair is free. As in recent years (since 2004) the fair held a free 'film night' the previous day featuring short films made by local people. The fair has a following of alternative lifestyles.

Music and art
A range of musical genres are represented at the fair across several music stages. Local bands are predominantly selected to play. Children are catered for with a free and enclosed entertainments area that includes face painters, a family friendly café, a marquee of activities such as painting and crafts, storytelling and other attractions. An Arts area also allows local art to be displayed and for visitors to the fair to try something new.

Current Music Stages
Current music stages found on the official website under Areas and Events.
 
Supertunes - House and Techno
Portland Ballroom - Upcoming local musicians, named due to the community support provided by the Portland Arms bar.
The Super Shady Nasties - Ska, Punk, Funk, Rock, Alternative, Drum and Bass. Nasties were previously known as Wigwam.
Cambridge 105 Radio - Top local musicians and a few radio presenters from Cambridge 105 Radio
Love Music Hate Racism - Rock, Grime, Punk, Jazz
The Flying Pig - Cajun, Americana, Funk, Blues, Rock and Roll, Folk, Jazz and Country Art Rock
Scarecrow Corner - Anarcho Punk, Psychedelic, Folk, Reggae and Dance
GreenMachine - Electronic, Rave and Dance
The Cambuskers Showcase - Buskers and Street performers
The Kings Head - Electronic Dance Music
Rebel Arts Bandstand - Punk and Ska
Village Green - Samba and Psychedelic Rock
Random Bullshit Generator - Games and Electronic, Dance

Organisation

In the constitution, the object of the fair is described thus:

"The object of the Fair shall be to hold a Fair, called Strawberry Fair, annually on Midsummer Common, Cambridge, on the first (1st) Saturday in June, for the benefit of the local community, particularly the children. The Fair shall have free entry and entertainments, including music and theatre."

The fair is run by a committee of local people who elect a Chair, Vice-Chair, Treasurer, and Secretary each year in September/October to form a Steering Group. Sub-committees also operate in order to discuss specific areas of the fair's operation, namely Programming, Finance and Admin, Policy and Community, and Site. The heads of these sub-committees report back at monthly General Meetings - weekly closer to the fair - which provides accountability and allows for the approval (or otherwise) of proposals put forward by the sub-committees.

Approximately 1000 people volunteer their time to make Strawberry Fair happen, which is seen by the committee as one of its greatest aspects. These volunteers include members of the committee itself, stewards, an environment team, area coordinators, stage managers, backstage staff, stalls coordinators, and many people 'behind the scenes' who undertake administration.

The fair is a free event because of volunteers. Income from stalls meets infrastructure and overhead costs. Benefit gigs are held throughout the year to raise money (for example, Strawberry Sundae). The local bands that play these gigs usually also play on the day of the fair. Strawberry Fair also organise and run the Cambridge Band Competition which has been running since 1984. Heats are held each year in The Portland Arms music venue, with the final at Cambridge Junction. All finalists in the Cambridge Band Competition also get invited to play at the Fair.

Strawberry Fair merchandise - including T-shirts, badges, programmes and posters - is also sold from Information Tents on Fair days and at benefit and band competition heats and final.

In 2019 the theme of the Fair was "Love". In January 2022 the fair’s website said:

 Strawberry Fair will be back on 11th June 2022 after the longest break in its history with the theme Love the Planet.

See also 
 Stourbridge fair
 List of strawberry topics

References

External links
 Strawberry Fair official website
 Strawberry Shorts official film festival website
Cambridge News — Volunteers make a fair team
BBC Cambridgeshire — Strawberry Fair 2009
Friends of Starwberry Fair

Music in Cambridge
Festivals in Cambridge
Summer festivals
Free festivals
Music festivals in Cambridgeshire
Film festivals in England
Film festivals established in 1973
Counterculture festivals
Fairs in England
Strawberries
Strawberry festivals
Music festivals established in 1973